The Chennault Aviation and Military Museum is a museum located in Monroe, Louisiana that preserves and highlights the establishment of the local aviation industry. It exhibits artifacts from World War I to the Afghanistan War, including aircraft and vehicle displays. The museum is named in honor of United States Army Air Force General Claire Lee Chennault. 

Chennault's granddaughter, Nell Chennault Calloway, has served as CEO of the museum since 2017.

Location 

The museum is located at the Selman Field Navigation School, an air force training facility.

References

External links
 Chennault Aviation and Military Museum

Museums in Ouachita Parish, Louisiana
Military and war museums in Louisiana
Buildings and structures in Monroe, Louisiana
Aerospace museums in Louisiana